Adolph Olson Eberhart (June 30, 1870 – December 6, 1944) was an American politician, who served as the 17th Governor of Minnesota.

Background
Adolph Olson Eberhart was born in Kil, in Värmland, Sweden, the son of Andrew and Louise Olson. Because of bad economic conditions, Andrew, Louise and all of the family except Adolph emigrated to St. Peter, Minnesota. In 1882, Adolph joined the family there. Eberhart graduated from Gustavus Adolphus College, St. Peter, Minnesota (1895) and studied law in a law office in Mankato, Minnesota.

Career

Eberhart was a member of the Minnesota State Senate from January 1903 to January 1907. He was elected the 17th Lieutenant Governor in 1906.  He became the 17th Governor of Minnesota on September 21, 1909, when Governor John Albert Johnson died, and served until January 5, 1915. Eberhart was a Republican. Minnesota elected Governors and Lt. Governors on separate ballots until 1974, so it happened occasionally that the two were of different parties. Elected the youngest member of the state senate in 1902, the Republican Eberhart was chosen as lieutenant governor four years later in the administration of the legendary Democrat, John Albert Johnson. Although his first partial term as governor resulted from Johnson's death in 1909, he subsequently won the office twice on his own merits.

An efficient administrator, Eberhart was also a consummate politician, and his detractors, including many Republicans, questioned his sincerity as well as the reputation of certain close associates. To assure his re-nomination in 1912, he called a special 13-day legislative session and deflated his critics by bulldozing through such progressive reforms as rural school consolidation and primary elections. Eberhart's strategy worked; he avoided the censure of his own party and was re-nominated for a second full term in the first statewide primary.

Eberhart lost his re-nomination bid for a fourth term as governor. A second defeat in the 1916 U.S. Senate primary marked the end of his political career. After a career as a real estate and insurance executive in Chicago, he retired to a rest home where he died in Savage, Minnesota. 
An inventory of his gubernatorial records is maintained at the Minnesota Historical Society Library.

See also
List of U.S. state governors born outside the United States

References

External links

  	

	
 	

1870 births
1944 deaths
Republican Party governors of Minnesota
Republican Party Minnesota state senators
American Lutherans
Lieutenant Governors of Minnesota
Gustavus Adolphus College alumni
Swedish emigrants to the United States
People from Kil Municipality
People from St. Peter, Minnesota